Aija Kukule (born in Rēzekne 1 October 1956) is a Latvian singer.

She performed at the 1981 Mikrofona aptauja with Līga Kreicberga. Their song was "Dāvāja Māriņa meitenei mūžiņu" (English: Dear Māra gave the girl life). The song was later a big hit in Soviet Union and covered by many artist, most famously by Alla Pugacheva. Aija Kukule received the Grand Music Award  in 1993.

Discography
 Naktsputni [with "Modo"]. Melodija, 1978.
 Dzied Aija Kukule [EP]. Melodija, 1980.
 Dzied Aija Kukule un "Dzeguzīte". 1985.
 Raimonda Paula dziesmas. Melodija, 1985.
 Meža gulbji. Mikrofona ieraksti, 1995.
 Labākās dziesmas. Baltic Records Group, 2005.

References

20th-century Latvian women singers
Living people
1956 births
People from Rēzekne
21st-century Latvian women singers